Oak Park is an unincorporated community in Maywood Township, Benton County, Minnesota, United States.  The community is located along State Highway 23 (MN 23) near Benton County Road 7.  Nearby places include Foley, Ronneby, and Foreston.

Oak Park has a post office with ZIP code 56357.

Oak Park was named for a grove of oak trees near the town site.

References

Unincorporated communities in Benton County, Minnesota
Unincorporated communities in Minnesota